Aslout     is a village in Zgharta District, in the Northern Governorate of Lebanon. It is a Maronite Christian community.

References

External links
Ehden Family Tree 

Populated places in the North Governorate
Zgharta District
Maronite Christian communities in Lebanon